Ferenc Németh may refer to:

 Ferenc Németh (pentathlete), Hungarian modern pentathlete
 Ferenc Németh (basketball), Hungarian-French basketball player
 Ferenc Németh (cross-country skier), Hungarian cross-country skier
 Ferenc Nemeth (musician), Hungarian jazz drummer and composer